The  is a river through Gifu and Fukui prefectures in Japan.

Geography
The Ishitoro River flows from Mount Chōshi (銚子ヶ峰 Chōshi-ga-mine) on the borders of Gujō and Takayama in Gifu Prefecture and flows south before emptying into the Kuzuryū River near Ōno in Fukui Prefecture.

There are two majors dams along the river, both in Ōno: the Itoshiro Dam (石徹白ダム Itoshiro Damu) and the Yanbara Dam (山原ダム Yanbara Damu).

References

External links

 (confluence with Kuzuryū River)

Rivers of Fukui Prefecture
Rivers of Gifu Prefecture
Rivers of Japan